Grisha Ostrovski (25 May 1918 – 30 April 2007) was a Bulgarian film director. He directed seven films between 1967 and 1979. His 1967 film Detour was entered into the 5th Moscow International Film Festival where it won the Special Golden Prize and the Prix FIPRESCI.

Selected filmography
 Detour (1967)
 Men on a Business Trip (1969)
 The Five from the Moby Dick (1970)

References

External links

1918 births
2007 deaths
Bulgarian film directors
French emigrants to Bulgaria